Fabio Santamaria Sotomayor (born 14 July 1925) was a Cuban wrestler. He competed in the men's freestyle bantamweight at the 1948 Summer Olympics.

References

External links
 

1925 births
Possibly living people
Cuban male sport wrestlers
Olympic wrestlers of Cuba
Wrestlers at the 1948 Summer Olympics
Place of birth missing